Friedrich (Frederick) Weyerhäuser  (November 21, 1834 – April 4, 1914), also spelled Weyerhaeuser, was a German-American timber mogul and founder of the Weyerhaeuser Company, which owns saw mills, paper factories, and other business enterprises, and large areas of forested land. He is the eighth-richest American of all time, with a net worth of $85 billion in 2016 dollars. He was known as the "timber-king of the Northwest."

Biography
Friedrich was one of 11 children of Johann Weyerhäuser and his wife. The family supported itself by working a  farm and a  vineyard near Nieder-Saulheim in the independent Grand Duchy of Hesse.  Friedrich started attending the Lutheran school at Nieder-Saulheim when he was 6, and at 8 began helping on the farm.  When he was 12, his father died, and Friedrich had to give up most of his studies to help out on the farm.  The Revolutions of 1848 in Germany prompted several members of his family to emigrate to western Pennsylvania in the United States.  They sent back glowing letters describing the conditions they found.

In 1852, at the age of 17, Weyerhäuser emigrated with a group of his family from Hesse to the United States.  They landed in New York City in July and proceeded to Pennsylvania, settling at North East. Frederick went to work for an earlier immigrant in a brewery. After two years, he abandoned the brewing business, because, as he put it, he felt that a brewer "often becomes his own best customer." He then worked on a farm for a year.

His share of the funds from the sale of the family farm in Germany enabled him to move on further west in search of opportunity, and 1856 found him in Rock Island, Illinois, working on the construction of the Rock Island and Peoria Railroad.  After a short time, he entered the sawmill of Mead, Smith and Marsh as a night fireman, quickly moving up to tallyman and then yard manager and salesman. When the company opened a new yard in Coal Valley, he was sent to manage it.  Though his yard prospered, the firm got into financial difficulties, and with savings from his salary Frederick bought the business. Thus he began doing business under his own name.

With his brother-in-law, Frederick Denkmann, he formed the Weyerhaeuser-Denkmann Lumber Company and began to acquire interests, including some majority interests, in many other timber companies. He became the central point in what was later called the "Weyerhauser Syndicate," a network of lumber interests, "reputed to have almost a hundred partners, none of whom knew the business of the others," with Weyerhaeuser as the common link. In 1872, he established the Mississippi River Boom and Logging Co., an alliance that handled all the logs that were processed on the Mississippi River. In 1900, Weyerhäuser bought  of timberland in the Pacific Northwest from James J. Hill and founded the Weyerhäuser Timber Company. One of the 30 factories in which he held an interest was Potlatch, later Potlatch Corporation. He also owned interests in the Boise Cascade Corporation. The Weyerhaeuser Company is still the world's largest seller of timber.

In 1906, Weyerhäuser's business concerns entered the public eye when the Interstate Commerce Commission recommended to Congress that the lumber industry be investigated for possible anti-trust violations. Weyerhäuser ignored the resulting attention.

Weyerhäuser married Sarah Elizabeth Bloedel on October 11, 1857. The couple had seven children: John P. Weyerhauser, Elise (Weyerhauser) Bancroft Hill,  Margaret (Weyerhauser) Jewett, Apollonia (Weyerhauser) Davis, Charles A. Weyerhauser, Rudolph M. Weyerhauser, and Frederick E. Weyerhauser.

In thanks to his home community, in 1904 he established a music hall in Saulheim.

Weyerhäuser was buried in the family mausoleum in Chippiannock Cemetery in Rock Island, Illinois.  Weyerhäuser was inducted into the U.S. Business Hall of Fame in 1978.

See also
Weyerhaeuser House, listed on the National Register of Historic Places in Illinois

References

Further reading
 Healey, Judith Koll. Frederick Weyerhaeuser and the American West (Minnesota Historical Society Press; 2013) 256 pages; scholarly biography

External links 
 The   Weyerhaeuser Family Papers and  F. Weyerhaeuser and Company Records  are available for research use at the Minnesota Historical Society
 

1834 births
1914 deaths
German emigrants to the United States
18th-century American businesspeople
Businesspeople in timber
Weyerhaeuser
People from Alzey-Worms
American company founders
American billionaires
Burials in Illinois
19th-century American businesspeople